Holy Cross Roman Catholic Church may refer to:

 Holy Cross Roman Catholic Church (Baltimore, Maryland)
 Holy Cross Roman Catholic Church (Maspeth, New York)